Heggeri is a village in Dharwad district of Karnataka, India.

Demographics 
As of the 2011 Census of India there were 105 households in Heggeri and a total population of 478 consisting of 233 males and 245 females. There were 84 children ages 0-6.

References

Villages in Dharwad district